Triangle Brigade Football Club is an American soccer club based in North Carolina's Research Triangle area. Triangle Brigade is a member of the Triangle Adult Soccer League, a United States Adult Soccer Association affiliated league.

History
The club was founded in January 2014 with the stated goal of bringing an elite level of amateur soccer to North Carolina. Triangle Brigade entered the 2015 Lamar Hunt U.S. Open Cup qualification tournament for Region III and won the championship by defeating the defending regional champions NTX Rayados to qualify for the 2015 Lamar Hunt U.S. Open Cup.

Honors
USASA Region III Open Cup
 2014

References

External links
 Official site

2014 establishments in North Carolina
Association football clubs established in 2014
Soccer clubs in North Carolina
Sports in Raleigh-Durham